WHRY (1450 AM) is a radio station broadcasting an oldies format. Licensed to Hurley, Wisconsin, United States, the station is currently owned by Baroka Broadcasting, Inc., and features programming from ABC Radio.

References

External links

HRY
Oldies radio stations in the United States
Radio stations established in 1985
1985 establishments in Wisconsin